Rev. John Lothropp (1584–1653) — sometimes spelled Lothrop or Lathrop — was an English Anglican clergyman, who became a Congregationalist minister and emigrant to New England. He was among the first settlers of Barnstable, Massachusetts. Perhaps Lothropp's principal claim to fame is that he was a strong proponent of the idea of the Separation of Church and State (also called "Freedom of Religion").  This idea was considered heretical in England during his time, but eventually became the mainstream view of people in the United States of America, because of the efforts of John Lothropp and others.  Lothropp left an indelible mark on the culture of New England, and through that, upon the rest of the country.  He has had many notable descendants, including at least six US presidents, as well as many other prominent Governors, government leaders, leaders of the Church of Jesus Christ of Latter-day Saints, and business people.

Biography

Early life
Lothropp was born in Etton, East Riding of Yorkshire. He was baptised on 20 December 1584. He attended Queens' College, Cambridge, where he matriculated in 1601, graduated with a BA in 1605, and with an MA in 1609.

Ministry and incarceration
He was ordained in the Church of England and appointed curate of a local parish in Egerton, Kent. In 1623 he renounced his orders and joined the cause of the Independents. Lothropp gained prominence in 1624, when he was called to replace Reverend Henry Jacob as the pastor of the First Independent Church in London, a congregation of sixty members which met at Southwark. Church historians sometimes call this church the Jacob-Lathrop-Jessey (JLJ) Church, named for its first three pastors, Henry Jacob, John Lothropp and Henry Jessey.

They were forced to meet in private to avoid the scrutiny of Bishop of London William Laud. Following the group's discovery on 22 April 1632 by officers of the king, forty-two of Lothropp's Independents were arrested. Only eighteen escaped capture. The arrested were prosecuted for failure to take the oath of loyalty to the established church. Evidence gleaned by the historians Burrage and Kiffin and from the Jessey records indicate many were jailed in The Clink prison. As for Reverend John Lothropp, the question is still unresolved. English historian Samuel Rawson Gardiner, whose book Reports of Cases in the Courts of Star Chamber and High Commission, gives an account of the courtroom trial and cites information from the trial record that the convicted dissenters were to be divided up and sent to various prisons. Historian E. B. Huntington suggests Lothropp was incarcerated in either the Clink or Newgate. Further, it may be that Lothropp actually served time in both prisons since it was customary to move prisoners from one prison to another due to space availability. In the end, the precise location of Lothropp's imprisonment is not confirmable from primary documentation.

While Lothropp was in prison, his wife Hannah House became ill and died. His six surviving children were, according to tradition, left to fend for themselves begging for bread on the streets of London. Friends, being unable to care for his children, brought them to the Bishop who had charge of Lothropp. After about a year, all were released on bail except Lothropp, who was deemed too dangerous to be set at liberty. The Bishop ultimately released him on bond in May 1634 with the understanding that he would immediately remove to the New World. Since he did not immediately leave for the New World, a court order was subsequently put out for him. Family tradition and other historical reflections indicate he then "escaped."

Emigration
Lothropp was told that he would be pardoned upon acceptance of terms to leave England permanently with his family along with as many of his congregation members as he could take who would not accept the authority of the Church of England. Lathrop accepted the terms of the offer and left for Plymouth, Massachusetts. With his group, he sailed on the Griffin and arrived in Boston on 18 September 1634. The record found on page 71 of Governor Winthrop's Journal, quotes John Lothropp, a freeman, rejoicing in finding a "church without a bishop. . .and a state without a king." John Lothropp married Ann (surname unknown) (1616–1687).

Lothropp did not stay in Boston long. Within days, he and his group relocated to Scituate where they "joined in covenaunt together" along with nine others who preceded them to form the "church of Christ collected att Scituate." The Congregation at Scituate was not a success. Dissent on the issue of baptism as well as other unspecified grievances and the lack of good grazing land and fodder for their cattle caused the church in Scituate to split in 1638.

Lothropp petitioned Governor Thomas Prence in Plymouth for a "place for the transplanting of us, to the end that God might have more glory and wee more comfort." Thus as Otis says "Mr. Lothropp and a large company arrived in Barnstable, 11 October 1639 O.S., bringing with them the crops which they had raised in Scituate." There, within three years they had built homes for all the families and then Lothropp began construction on a larger, sturdier meeting house adjacent to Coggin's (or Cooper's) Pond, which was completed in 1644. This building, now part of the Sturgis Library in Barnstable, Massachusetts is one of John Lothrop's original homes and meeting houses, and is now also the oldest building housing a public library in the USA.

Genealogy

Children
Lothropp married Hannah House/Howse in England, on 10 October 1610. They had eight children:
 Thomas Lothropp, baptised 21 February 1612/3 in Eastwell, Kent, England, by his grandfather Rev. John Howse, parson there. Record from Bishop's Transcript records at Canterbury.
 Jane Lothropp, baptised 29 September 1614 in Egerton, Kent, England; married Mayflower passenger Samuel Fuller (1608–1683), son of Mayflower passenger Edward Fuller (1575-1621).
 Anne Lothropp, baptised 12 May 1616 in Egerton, England; buried in Egerton 30 April 1617.
 John Lothropp, baptised 22 February 1617/8 in Egerton, England
 Barbara Lothropp, baptised 31 October 1619 in Egerton, England
 Samuel Lothropp, born about 1621 in Egerton, England
 Captain Joseph Lothropp, baptised 11 April 1624 in Eastwell, Kent, England
 Benjamin Lothropp, born December 1626 in Eastwell, Kent, England

After Hannah's death, Lothropp married again, to Ann (surname unknown) in 1635. They had five children:
 Barnabas Lothropp, baptised 6 June 1636 in Scituate, Massachusetts
 <li>Unnamed daughter, buried 30 July 1638.
 Abigail Lothropp, baptised 2 November 1639 in Barnstable, Massachusetts
 Bathsheba Lothropp, baptised 27 February 1641/42 in Barnstable, MA
 Elizabeth Lothropp, born about 1643
 Captain John Lothropp, baptised 18 May 1645 in Barnstable, MA
 <li>Unnamed son, buried 25 January 1649/50 in Barnstable. Died immediately after birth.

Descendants
Lothropp's direct descendants in America and elsewhere number more than 80,000, including:

Rev. John Lathrop (1740-1816), great-great-grandson; congregationalist Boston minister
Rev. R.A. Torrey
Rev. Robert P. Shuler
 Presidents of the United States:
 Millard Fillmore
 James A. Garfield
 Ulysses S. Grant
 Franklin D. Roosevelt
 George H. W. Bush
 George W. Bush
 Revolutionary War figure Benedict Arnold
 Early leaders of the Church of Jesus Christ of Latter-day Saints
 Joseph Smith
Hyrum Smith
 Wilford Woodruff
 Oliver Cowdery
 Parley P. Pratt
 Orson Pratt
 State governors:
 Jeb Bush
 Thomas E. Dewey
Jon Huntsman, Jr.
 William W. Kitchin
 Sarah Palin
 George W. Romney
 Mitt Romney
 Jim Guy Tucker
 US Senator Adlai Stevenson III
 Secretary of State John Foster Dulles
 CIA Director Allen Welsh Dulles
Joseph F. Smith, 6th President of the Church of Jesus Christ of Latter-day Saints
Joseph Fielding Smith, 10th President of the Church of Jesus Christ of Latter-day Saints
 Ezra Taft Benson, U.S. Secretary of Agriculture and 13th President of the Church of Jesus Christ of Latter-day Saints
 Roman Catholic cardinal Avery Dulles
 Old West gunfighter and lawman Wild Bill Hickok
 Poet Henry Wadsworth Longfellow
Educator, president of Yale University, and American diplomat Kingman Brewster, Jr.
Historian, College Administrator, and president of Harvard University, Catherine Drew Gilpin Faust
 Speaker of the United States House of Representatives Galusha A. Grow, father of the Homestead Act
 Historical, Asahel Lathrop Mormon Pioneer
 Artists Louis Comfort Tiffany and Georgia O'Keeffe
 Physician, author Benjamin Spock
 Co-founder of Stanford University Jane Stanford
 Author and doctor Oliver Wendell Holmes, Sr. and his son, US Supreme Court Justice Oliver Wendell Holmes, Jr.
 Novelist Michael MacConnell
 Founder of Post Cereal Company C. W. Post
 Founder of General Foods Marjorie Merriweather Post
 Founder of Fuller Brush Company Alfred Carl Fuller
 Founder of University of Chicago Law School, Founder of the Harvard Law Review, and Royall Professor of Law at Harvard University Law School, Joseph Henry Beale
 Financier John Pierpont Morgan
 The Allred family, including actor Corbin Allred and polygamist sect leaders and brothers Rulon C. Allred and Owen A. Allred
 Actresses Dina Merrill, Shirley Temple, Brooke Shields, Jordana Brewster and Maggie Gyllenhaal and her brother actor Jake Gyllenhaal.
 Actors Clint Eastwood and Kevin Bacon
 Singer Nick Carter of The Backstreet Boys and his younger brother Aaron Carter

Family tree

See also

Barnstable, Massachusetts
Congregationalism
Plymouth Colony
Lowthorp for a discussion of the origins and spelling variations of the name Lo-/Lathrop.

Bibliography
 Huntington, Rev E. B., A.M. "A Genealogical Memoir of the Lo-Lathrop Family in this country embracing as far as known the descendants of The Rev. John Lothropp of Scituate and Barnstable, Mass., and Mark Lothrop of Salem and Bridgewater, Mass. the first generation of descendants of other names." ; Ridgefield Ct. 1884.
Price, Richard. John Lothropp: "A Puritan Biography And Genealogy". Salt Lake City, Utah, 1984.
Otis, Amos. "Genealogical Notes of Barnstable Families". 1888.
Holt, Helene Exiled : the story of John Lathrop, 1584–1653, a biographical novel 1987

Notes

External links
 Lothropp Foundation
 Barnstable county history page
 John Lothrop in Great Migration: Immigrants to New England, 1634-1635.
 Sturgis Library History
 History of the Jacob Lathrop Jessy Church
 Notable Descendants of Rev. John Lathrop/Lothropp, Founder of Barnstable, Massachusetts
Immigrant Ancestor Rev. John Lathrop
  Lathrop Genealogy  Lathrop history and resources for genealogical research.
 

1584 births
1653 deaths
Alumni of Queens' College, Cambridge
People from the East Riding of Yorkshire
American Congregationalist ministers
17th-century English Anglican priests
English separatists
17th-century Congregationalist ministers
People of colonial Massachusetts
People from Barnstable, Massachusetts
American city founders
Immigrants to Plymouth Colony
Clergy from Yorkshire
Kingdom of England emigrants to Massachusetts Bay Colony
People from Eastwell, Kent